Lauren Clay (born 1982) is an American artist who lives and works in Brooklyn, New York. She is known for her large architectural installations and relief sculptures. Her work often contains mythological and historical architectural references  In 2019, Clay became a recipient of the Pollock-Krasner Foundation Grant.

Biography 

Clay grew up in the suburbs of Atlanta, Georgia. She attended Savannah College of Art and Design where she received a Bachelor of Fine Arts degree in Painting in 2004. Clay received a MFA from Virginia Commonwealth University in Painting and Printmaking in 2007.

References 

1982 births
Living people
Savannah College of Art and Design alumni
Virginia Commonwealth University alumni
Artists from Brooklyn
Artists from Atlanta
21st-century American women artists
21st-century American sculptors